Empty is the debut studio album by American Christian rock band Tait and was the first of three solo albums released by members of dc Talk following their 2001 hiatus to work on solo projects. This album features Pete Stewart from Grammatrain, who is absent in the next album. Several songs are influenced by the passing of Michael Tait's late father Nathel, for whom the band is named.

The advance pre-release copy for this album contained slightly different mixes to the released CD and omitted the track "Altars" as well as both hidden tracks. "Altars" is the only song from this album to be turned into a music video; "Loss For Words" was featured on the soundtrack for the movie Extreme Days.

There are two hidden tracks on this CD, one an instrumental piece that appears after the closing track "Unglued," the other in the pregap (or "zero" index) before the opening track "Alibi," which can be accessed by pressing the 'rewind' button on the CD player when track one begins. The disc scans back 6 minutes and 48 seconds into negative numbers revealing answering machine messages with Michael Tait doing various character impersonations. There is also a short joke-oriented piece in this hidden track.

Track listing

Personnel 

Tait
 Michael Tait – vocals 
 Pete Stewart – keyboards, programming, guitars 
 Lonnie Chapin – bass
 Chad Chapin – drums 

Additional musicians
 Carl Herrgesell – keyboards
 Mike Linney – programming 
 Michael W. Smith – piano (13)
 John Mark Painter – string arrangements 
 The Love Sponge Orchestra – strings

Production

 Michael Tait – producer 
 Pete Stewart – producer, engineer 
 Mark Heimmerman – additional vocal production (4, 7, 10)
 Greg Ham – executive producer 
 Mark Nicholas – executive producer, A&R direction 
 F. Reid Shippen – engineer, mixing (5, 8, 11)
 Dan Shike – additional engineer 
 Todd Robbins – additional engineer, mixing (13)
 Chris Lord-Alge – mixing (1, 3, 7)
 Bryan Lenox – mixing (4, 12)
 Brian Tankersley – mixing (6, 10)
 Shawn Andrews – digital editing 
 Ted Jensen – mastering at Sterling Sound, New York City
 Richard Dodd – additional mastering
 Scott McDaniel – art direction
 Room 120 – artwork, design
 Kristin Barlowe – photography 
 Woodland Sound Studios, Nashville, Tennessee – recording location
 The Dungeon Studios, Nashville, Tennessee – recording location
 Fun Attic Studio, Franklin, Tennessee – recording location

References 

Tait (band) albums
2001 albums
ForeFront Records albums